32nd Brigade or 32nd Infantry Brigade may refer to:

 32nd Brigade (Australia), an infantry brigade in the Second World War
 32 Canadian Brigade Group, a unit of the Canadian Army
 32nd Marines Brigade (Greece), a unit of the Greek Army
 32nd (Imperial Service) Brigade of the British Indian Army in the First World War
 32nd Indian Infantry Brigade of the British Indian Army in the Second World War
 32nd Reinforced Brigade of the Armed People, an elite, special-forces unit of the Libyan military, often referred to as the "Khamis Brigade", after its commander, Khamis Gaddafi.
 32nd Infantry Brigade Combat Team (United States), a unit of the United States Army

United Kingdom
 32nd (Midland) Anti-Aircraft Brigade
 32nd Infantry Brigade (United Kingdom)
 32nd Army Tank Brigade (United Kingdom)
 Artillery brigades
 32nd Brigade Royal Field Artillery

See also
 32nd Division (disambiguation)
 32nd Regiment (disambiguation)
 32nd Battalion (disambiguation)
 32nd Squadron (disambiguation)